Casla (Costello or Costelloe) is a Gaeltacht village between Indreabhán (Inverin) and An Cheathrú Rua (Carraroe) in western County Galway, Ireland. The headquarters of RTÉ Raidió na Gaeltachta is located there. The village lies on the R336 road beside Clynagh Bay. Casla  means "(twisting) creek" or "inlet from the sea" in Irish.

It is served by Bus Éireann route 424 from Galway City.

In the novel The Wind Changes by Olivia Manning, set among the Irish independence fighters in 1921, Riordan, the last of the leaders of the 1916 Easter Rising, is to land at the pier in Casla.

Costelloe Lodge is a large house built in 1925 by the architect Edwin Lutyens with gardens designed by Gertrude Jekyll, to replace a fishing lodge that was burned down in 1922 during the Irish Civil War. It was the home of J. Bruce Ismay, chairman of the White Star Line. Ismay was severely criticised after surviving the sinking of the Titanic by taking a place in a lifeboat.

Notable people
Caitlín Maude, poet, activist, and singer
J. Bruce Ismay, shipowner

See also
 List of towns in the Republic of Ireland

References

Towns and villages in County Galway
Gaeltacht places in County Galway
Gaeltacht towns and villages
Articles on towns and villages in Ireland possibly missing Irish place names